The Wilkes County Schools system is a PK–12 graded school district in North Carolina covering nearly all of Wilkes County. The third-largest employer in the county, the district manages 22 schools that serve 10,374 students as of 2010–11.

History
The history of public education in Wilkes County really began shortly after the state passed its first common school law in 1839. The state was then divided into several school districts.

As late as the 1930s, Wilkes county had as many as 151 one- or two-teacher schoolhouses. Over the next few decades, a general move toward school system consolidation, as well as racial integration, culminated in the merger of the county system with the North Wilkesboro city schools. Prior to 1975, North Wilkesboro had its own separate school system called North Wilkesboro City Schools. Facing increasing expenses with school construction and repair, the two boards merged on July 1, 1975.

The Wilkes County Schools system is the third-largest employer in Wilkes County.

Student demographics
For the 2010–11 school year, Wilkes County Schools had a total population of 10,374 students and 639.52 teachers on a (FTE) basis. This produced a student-teacher ratio of 16.22:1. That same year, out of the student total, the gender ratio was 51% male to 49% female. The demographic group makeup was: White, 81%; Hispanic, 11%; Black, 4%; American Indian, <1%, and Asian/Pacific Islander, <1%; two or more races: 3%).

Governance and funding
The primary governing body of Wilkes County Schools follows a council–manager government format with a five-member Board of Education appointing a Superintendent to run the day-to-day operations of the system. Wilkes County Schools currently resides in the North Carolina State Board of Education's Seventh District.

Board of education
A five-member board of education governs the Wilkes County Schools system. The current members are as follows: Rudy Holbrook (Chairman), Sharron Huffman (Vice-Chairman), Darren Shumate, Kirk Walker, and Leslie Barnes.

Superintendent
The current superintendent of Wilkes County Schools is Mark Byrd. Byrd had previously been assistant superintendent and was appointed superintendent after Dr. Marty Hemric resigned.

Funding
Total expenditures for the district for the 2009–10 school year totaled $ 93,091,000. Public school districts in North Carolina do not have their own taxation authority, they are fiscally dependent on the State and their respective county Board of Commissioners. The county Boards of Commissioners vote on funding levels proposed by the school system. The majority of the funding comes from State sources.

Member schools
The Wilkes County Schools system has 22 schools ranging from pre-kindergarten to twelfth grade, including an early college high school. Those 22 schools are separated into 5 high schools, 4 middle schools and 13 elementary schools.

High schools
 East Wilkes High School (Cardinals), Ronda
 North Wilkes High School (Vikings), Hays
 West Wilkes High School (Blackhawks), Millers Creek
 Wilkes Central High School (Eagles), Moravian Falls
 Wilkes Early College High School, Wilkesboro

Middle schools
 Central Wilkes Middle School (Falcons), Moravian Falls
 East Wilkes Middle School (Scorpions), Ronda
 North Wilkes Middle School (Jaguars), Yellow Banks Road between Mulberry and Hays
 West Wilkes Middle School (Knights), Millers Creek

Elementary schools
 Boomer-Ferguson Elementary School (Bulldogs), Boomer
 C. B. Eller Elementary School (Trojans), Elkin
 C. C. Wright Elementary School (Tigers), North Wilkesboro
 Millers Creek Elementary School (Ravens), Millers Creek
 Moravian Falls Elementary School (Yellow Jackets), Moravian Falls
 Mt. Pleasant Elementary School (Blue Hawks), Ferguson
 Mountain View Elementary School (Dragons), Hays
 Mulberry Elementary School (Mustangs), Mulberry
 North Wilkesboro Elementary School (Eaglets), North Wilkesboro
 Roaring River Elementary School (Blue Jays), Roaring River
 Ronda-Clingman Elementary School (Panthers), Ronda
 Traphill Elementary School (Wildcats), Traphill
 Wilkesboro Elementary School (Eagles), Wilkesboro

Charter schools
There is only one charter school in Wilkes County: Bridges Charter School in State Road, North Carolina.

Athletics
The schools for the system are members of the North Carolina High School Athletic Association and compete in various sports in the Mountain Valley Conference. East, North, and West Wilkes are 1A schools and Wilkes Central is a 2A school. Wilkes Early college does not field athletic teams.

Achievements and awards
U.S. News & World Report named Wilkes Central High School and West Wilkes High School in their list of "America's Best High Schools". Wilkes Central High School was awarded a Silver and West High a Bronze.

See also
Elkin City Schools also serves some residents of Wilkes County.
List of school districts in North Carolina

References

External links

School districts in North Carolina
Education in Wilkes County, North Carolina
School districts established in 1975